Our Lady of Solitude Cathedral (also called Irapuato Cathedral) is the main Roman Catholic church in Irapuato, Mexico. It is located in front of the Plaza Monumental Miguel Hidalgo. It is the mother church of the Diocese of Irapuato, which is the seat of the bishopric. 

The date of its construction is unknown, but according to a census carried out by the Bishop of Michoacán, it existed as a parish in 1631. Its cathedral rank was granted in 2004 by Pope John Paul II.

Design 
Like most Baroque Catholic churches, it was designed in a Latin cross plan. Its vault consists of a corrugated canon with a polygonal cross-section, and its side arches and sub-arches are also polygonal. Its internal spaciousness stands out for its scale given the modest locality at the time.

See also 

Roman Catholicism in Mexico
Our Lady of Solitude
Roman Catholic Diocese of Irapuato

References

Roman Catholic cathedrals in Mexico
Irapuato
17th-century establishments in the Spanish Empire
17th-century Roman Catholic church buildings in Mexico
Baroque church buildings in Mexico
Church buildings with domes